Buddleja longiflora is a rare species endemic to one small area of Brazil, growing in fields high on the Serra do Caparaó at an altitude of 2400 m. The species was first described and named by Brade in 1957.

Description
Buddleja longiflora is a shrub 0.5 – 1 m high. The yellowish orange inflorescence is < 15 cm long, the flowers borne in paired 3 – 5 flowered cymes. The eponymous long flowers have corollas 35 – 42 mm long by 4 – 5 mm wide.

The species could be mistaken for B. speciosissima found in nearby Itatiaia, but for minor differences in flower and leaf dimensions. It is possible B. longiflora could be classified as a subspecies of the latter should more material be availed for examination.

Cultivation
The species is not known to be in cultivation.

References

longiflora
Flora of Brazil
Flora of South America